Oversize may refer to:
Oversize permit
Oversize cargo or Oversize load
Oversized racket (sports equipment) as used in squash and tennis
"Oversized", a song by Basement from Promise Everything
Oversized People